Yenişehir railway station is a railway station on the Başkentray commuter rail line in Ankara, Turkey. The station is located a few blocks north of Kızılay Square, on the corner of Atatürk and Celal Bayar Boulevards and is the first station east of Ankara station, written as Gar on public transport maps. Yenişehir station was originally opened in 1972 with the inauguration of the Ankara suburban commuter service.  In July 2016, the station was demolished, rebuilt and is expected to open on 12 April 2018.

Connection to the M1 line of the Ankara Metro is available.

Gallery

References

Railway stations in Ankara Province
Railway stations opened in 1972
1972 establishments in Turkey
Altındağ, Ankara